David Alberto Depetris (born 11 November 1988) is an Slovak footballer who plays as a forward for MFK Dukla Banská Bystrica in the Slovak 2. liga. Born in Argentina, he played for the Slovakia national team.

He started his European career in Slovak Superliga club Trenčín.

Club career

Early years

Born in San Jorge, Argentina, Depetris began his career with hometown club C.D. San Jorge. In 2005, he joined Atlético de Rafaela and three years later he moved to Europe, to Slovak club AS Trenčín. He scored 21 goals in 30 matches in his first season in the Slovak second league.

AS Trenčín
Depetris joined AS Trenčín in January 2008.
He was the top goalscorer in two Slovak 1. liga seasons; in the 2008–09 Slovak 1. liga season, scoring 21 goals, and in the 2010–11 Slovak 1. liga season, scoring 31 goals in 30 matches.

Çaykur Rizespor
After scoring a record 16 goals in the first half of the 2012-13 season at Trenčín, Depetris signed a three and half-year contract in the winter transfer window of 2013, with the TFF First League club Çaykur Rizespor. He made his debut on 27 January 2013 against Adana Demirspor, when he substituted Cumali Bişi. Çaykur Rizespor lost 1–2. David Depetris scored his first and second goals in the TFF First League against TKİ Tavşanlı Linyitspor on 3 February 2013.

Monarcas Morelia
Depetris was loaned by Çaykur Rizespor to Monarcas Morelia which currently plays in the Liga MX. Prior to arrival to Mexico, David Depetris played for SK Sigma Olomouc in the Czech First League.

International career
Depetris has Argentinian, Italian and Slovak citizenship. He received Italian citizenship before his arrival in Europe, being of Italian descent. He spent five years in Slovakia, thereby qualifying to receive citizenship. Depetris received Slovak citizenship on 21 March 2013 and since then has been eligible to represent the Slovakia national football team. Depetris received an invitation to the Slovak national football team from coaching duo Stanislav Griga and Michal Hipp. After he obtained Slovak citizenship in March 2013, Depetris could have debuted for the national team in the 2014 match against Liechtenstein; however he ended up missing the match due to a muscle injury which flared up during training. He made his national team debut on 14 August against Romania.

Career statistics

Personal life
Depetris is married to Slovak fitness trainer Erika Depetris (née Kačincová). His brother, Rodrigo, is also a footballer.

Honours

Club
Spartak Trnava
 Slovak Cup: 2018–19

Individual
 Slovak Super Liga top scorer: 2012–13 (16 goals)
 Slovak Second League top scorer: 2008–09 (21 goals), 2010–11 (31 goals)

References

External links
 

1988 births
Living people
Sportspeople from Santa Fe Province
Slovak footballers
Slovakia international footballers
Argentine footballers
Naturalized citizens of Slovakia
Association football forwards
Argentine emigrants to Slovakia
Slovak people of Italian descent
Argentine people of Italian descent
Atlético de Rafaela footballers
AS Trenčín players
Almere City FC players
Çaykur Rizespor footballers
SK Sigma Olomouc players
Atlético Morelia players
FC Spartak Trnava players
Club Atlético Sarmiento footballers
FK Dukla Banská Bystrica players
2. Liga (Slovakia)  players
Slovak Super Liga players
Slovak expatriate footballers
Argentine expatriate footballers
Expatriate footballers in Argentina
Expatriate footballers in Slovakia
Expatriate footballers in Turkey
Expatriate footballers in the Netherlands
Expatriate footballers in Mexico
Argentine expatriate sportspeople in Slovakia
Argentine expatriate sportspeople in Turkey
Slovak expatriate sportspeople in Turkey
Argentine expatriate sportspeople in the Netherlands
Argentine expatriate sportspeople in Mexico
Slovak expatriate sportspeople in Mexico
Slovak expatriate sportspeople in Argentina
Süper Lig players
TFF First League players
Eerste Divisie players
Liga MX players
Citizens of Italy through descent
Naturalised association football players